The 2010 Arabia Women's Cup took place in Bahrain in October 2010.  The eight participating teams were Iraq, Jordan, Egypt, Lebanon, Palestine, Syria, Qatar and hosts Bahrain.  The 2010 tournament was the first installation. The winner of the tournament, Jordan, will attend a training session hosted by the defending World Cup champion, Germany.

Results

Group A

Group B

Knockout stages

Knockout Map

Semi finals

Third place play-off

Final

Awards

Final ranking

See also
Arab Women's Championship

References

External links
ثمانية منتخبات تتنافس في الطريق إلى ألمانيا – Al Arabiya

Women's international association football competitions
2010
2010 in women's association football
2010–11 in Bahraini football
2010–11 in Jordanian football
2010–11 in Egyptian football
2010–11 in Palestinian football
2010–11 in Iraqi football
2010–11 in Lebanese football
2010–11 in Syrian football
2010–11 in Qatari football